Jeanne Marie Omelenchuk (March 25, 1931 – June 26, 2008) was an American speed skater. She competed at the 1960, 1968 and the 1972 Winter Olympics. As a cyclist, she won the 1952 and 1955 amateur women's United States National Championship.

References

External links
 

1931 births
2008 deaths
American female speed skaters
Olympic speed skaters of the United States
Speed skaters at the 1960 Winter Olympics
Speed skaters at the 1968 Winter Olympics
Speed skaters at the 1972 Winter Olympics
Sportspeople from Detroit
20th-century American women
21st-century American women